Belevi can refer to:

 Belevi
 Belevi, Çal
 Belevi, Çameli